Baron Lionel Nathan de Rothschild (22 November 1808 – 3 June 1879) was a British Jewish banker, politician and philanthropist who was a member of the prominent Rothschild banking family of England. He became the first practicing Jew to sit as a Member of Parliament in the House of Commons of the United Kingdom.

Life and career

The eldest son of Nathan Mayer Rothschild and his wife, Hannah Barent-Cohen, he was a member of the wealthy Rothschild family. Both of his parents were Jewish. He was born in London, where his father had founded the English branch of the Europe-wide family.

In his earlier years, he studied at the University of Göttingen before embarking on an apprenticeship in the family business at London, Paris and Frankfurt. He was admitted to the family partnership in 1836 at a family gathering in Frankfurt.

Like his father, he was a Freiherr (baron) of the Austrian Empire, but unlike his father, he used the title in British society. By royal licence of Queen Victoria on 16 June 1838, he was allowed (along with other male-line descendants of his late father) to use the Austrian title of baron in the United Kingdom.

Prime Minister Gladstone proposed to Queen Victoria that Lionel be made a British peer. She demurred, saying that titling a Jew would raise antagonism and furthermore it would be unseemly to reward a man whose vast wealth was based on what she called "a species of gambling" rather than legitimate trade. However, the Queen did raise Lionel's son Nathan to the peerage in 1885, and he became the first Jewish member of the House of Lords.

Banker
Rothschild was responsible for raising large sums for the government, especially in the Crimean war, and for philanthropic relief of the victims of the Great Irish Famine. On 1 January 1847, he founded the British Relief Association, alongside Stephen Spring Rice, John Abel Smith and other notable aristocrats. The Association went on to raise £500,000, and was the largest private provider of relief during the Irish Famine and Highland Potato Famine. In 1861, in protest at the suppression of the Polish uprisings, he (initially) refused to contract a loan to Russia. His most famous undertaking was financing the government's purchase of the Suez Canal shares from Egypt for £4 million.

Parliament

In 1847, Lionel de Rothschild was first elected to the British House of Commons as one of four Members of Parliament for the City of London constituency. Because Jews were at that point still barred from sitting in the chamber due to the Christian oath required to be sworn in, Prime Minister Lord John Russell introduced a Jewish Disabilities Bill to remove the problem with the oath. In 1848, the bill was approved by the House of Commons but was twice rejected by the House of Lords. After being rejected again by the Upper House in 1849, Rothschild resigned his seat and stood again winning in a by-election to strengthen his claim.

In 1850, he entered the House of Commons to take his seat but refused to swear on a Christian Bible asking to use only the Hebrew Bible. This was permitted but when omitting the words "upon the true faith of a Christian" from the oath he was required to leave.

In 1851, a new Jewish Disabilities Bill was defeated in the House of Lords. In the 1852 general election, Rothschild was again elected but the next year the bill was again defeated in the upper house.

Finally, in the Jews Relief Act 1858, the House of Lords agreed to a proposal to allow each house to decide its own oath. On 26 July 1858, Rothschild took the oath with covered head, substituting "so help me, Jehovah" for the ordinary form of oath, and thereupon took his seat as the first Jewish member of Parliament. He was re-elected in general elections in 1859 and 1865, but defeated in 1868; he was returned unopposed in a by-election in 1869 but defeated a second time in the general election in 1874.

Personal life and family

A patron of thoroughbred horse racing, under the assumed name of "Mr Acton", his colt Sir Bevys won the 1879 Epsom Derby.

In 1836, Lionel de Rothschild married his first cousin Baroness Charlotte von Rothschild (1819–1884), daughter of Baron Carl Mayer von Rothschild of the Rothschild banking family of Naples.

They had the following children:
 Leonora (1837–1911)
 Evelina (1839–1866)
 Nathan Mayer (1840–1915)
 Alfred Charles (1842–1918)
 Leopold (1845–1917)

Illness and death

Lionel de Rothschild suffered from gout for more than 20 years.  He had a seizure on 3 June 1879 and died the next morning in his city home at 148 Piccadilly in London, aged 70. His body was interred at the Willesden Jewish Cemetery in the North London suburb of Willesden. The grave is marked by a "handsome granite memorial", and surrounded by a stone enclosure designed by the architect George Devey.

See also
History of the Jews in England
Electoral firsts in the United Kingdom

Notes

References

Sources

Further reading

 

 

 

 See also the list of references at: Rothschild banking family of England

External links

 
 

of the Austrian Empire

1808 births
1879 deaths
Liberal Party (UK) MPs for English constituencies
UK MPs 1847–1852
UK MPs 1852–1857
UK MPs 1857–1859
UK MPs 1859–1865
UK MPs 1865–1868
UK MPs 1868–1874
British philanthropists
British racehorse owners and breeders
Owners of Epsom Derby winners
English art collectors
Jewish British politicians
Lionel
English Jews
British Ashkenazi Jews
British railway entrepreneurs
Burials at Willesden Jewish Cemetery
English people of German-Jewish descent
N M Rothschild & Sons people
British bankers
Jewish bankers
19th-century British businesspeople